Equinox is an album by pianist Red Garland which was recorded in late 1978 and released on the Galaxy label in the following year.

Track listing
 "It's All Right with Me" (Cole Porter) – 7:35
 "Hobo Joe" (Joe Henderson) – 5:24
 "Equinox" (John Coltrane) – 7:03
 "Cute" (Neal Hefti) – 3:58
 "Nature Boy (eden ahbez) – 3:09
 "On a Clear Day (You Can See Forever)" (Burton Lane, Alan Jay Lerner) – 6:26
 "You Are Too Beautiful" (Richard Rodgers, Lorenz Hart) – 6:53

Personnel
Red Garland – piano
Richard Davis – bass
Roy Haynes – drums

References

Galaxy Records albums
Red Garland albums
1979 albums